Heidi Pico is a former women's cricketer for the Denmark national women's cricket team who played one ODI, against the Netherlands in 1998. Pico scored one run and did not bowl in the match.

References

Danish women cricketers
Denmark women One Day International cricketers
Living people
Year of birth missing (living people)